The Innovations in Reading Prize is an annual award given to organizations and individuals who "have developed innovative means of creating and sustaining a lifelong love of reading." The prize is awarded by the National Book Foundation, presenter of the National Book Awards. The Innovations in Reading prize was founded in 2009, and from 2009 to 2014, the National Book Foundation recognized up to five winners, who each received $2,500. Beginning in 2015, the Foundation began recognizing a single $10,000 prize winner each year, as well as four honorable mentions. In 2018, the Foundation began recognizing each honorable mention organization with a $1,000 prize.
  
Past Winners range from the hyperlocal to the global in scope and ambition and have demonstrated success in encouraging diverse audiences to read more widely and deeply.

Potential candidates can nominate themselves or be recommended for consideration.  Applications for the Innovations in Reading Prize are available online from mid-December to mid-February.

Innovations in Reading prize winners

2009
Fathers Bridging the Miles (A Program of Read to Me International)
Maricopa County Library District
James Patterson's ReadKiddoRead.com
readergirlz
Robert Wilder

2010
Cellpoems
826 Valencia
Free Minds Book Club & Writing Workshop
Mount Olive Baptist Church
United Through Reading

2011
Burton Freeman for My Own Book
Kore Press
Electric Literature/Electric Publisher
YARN, the Young Adult Review Network

2012
Bookends: A Television Program for Teens Who Like to Read
Lilli Leight
Literacy Chicago for Reading Against the Odds
Street Books
Inger Upchurch for Real Men Read Storytime and Mentoring

2013
City National Bank for Reading Is the Way Up
Little Free Library
The Uni Project
The Uprise Books Project
Worldreader

2014
Blue Star Families' Books on Bases
Books For Kids
Chicago Books to Women in Prison
Hopa Mountain's Storymakers Program
Las Comadres Para Las Americas
2015
 Reach Incorporated
2016
 Next Chapter Book Club
2017
 Barbershop Books

2018 

 Teach This Poem

Innovations in Reading Honorable Mentions 
2015
 African Poetry Book Fund
 Call Me Ishmael
 Lambda Literary
 MotionPoems
2016
 The Harry Potter Alliance
 LGBT Books to Prisoners
 Limitless Libraries
 Traveling Stories
2017
 Books@Work
 Great Reading Games from Learning Ally
 Poetry-in-Motion
 Reach Out and Read

2018 

 The Appalachian Prison Book Project
 Friends of the Homer Library
 Jewish Women International's Library Initiative
 Words Without Borders Campus

References

Literacy-related awards